Mu Ko Phetra is a marine national park in the Strait of Malacca off Thailand, covering mostly intact coastal line, open water, and about 30 islands of the southern part of Trang Province and the northern part of Satun Province. Established on 31 December 1984, it is the 49th national park and 14th marine national park of Thailand.

The two largest islands of the park are Ko Phetra and Ko Khao Yai. Several islands are marine turtle egg laying sites. Rich coral reefs are present around islands. Many of the islands consist of steep limestone rocks and little beaches. They are used as temporary refuges by fishermen during fishing season.

In the caves of the cliffs high above the ground on some of the islands are where swiftlets build their nest and breed. Several islands were placed under concession for decades to collect bird nests. They are highly valuable and closely guarded with firearms. Traveling to those islands should be done with local tour companies as their boats are recognized and ignored by guards.

The Thai name Phetra comes from Malay Pulau Petra (the island of Petra).

The continued existence of the park is threatened by the proposed Pak Bara deepwater seaport.

Trang islands

 Ko Lao Liang consists of two similar islands separated by just 300 m.  The smaller, northernmost island, Ko Lao Liang Nuea (also known as Ko Lao Liang Nong), and the larger island to the south, Ko Lao Liang Tai (also known as Ko Lao Liang Phi). Both have rather small beaches and are bird nest gathering concessions. Around the islands are shallow reefs.

Satun islands
 Ko Phetra ( / Malay: Pulau Petra) is an island with odd-shaped cliffs. A bird nest concession island, the surrounding sea is available for diving.
 Ko Lidi ( / Malay: Pulau Lidi) is a large island with beach.
 Ko Khao Yai, the biggest island with castle-like limestone rocks. Part of the island is the Ao Kam Poo, a 700 m wide bay with waterfall and stream. The shores of the bay are a turtle egg-laying sites.
 Ko Bulon ( / Malay: Pulau Bulan), a popular tourist island with clear water and coral reef.

Satun beaches
 Rawai Beach, not to be confused with a beach of the same name in Phuket Province, is a 3.5 km long beach on the mainland. It is popular camping spot.

See also
List of national parks of Thailand
List of Protected Areas Regional Offices of Thailand

References

External links
Mu Ko Petra National Park from National Park, Wildlife and Plant Conservation Department
Mu Ko Petra National Park from Ministry of Defense (Thai only)

National parks of Thailand
Protected areas established in 1984
Geography of Trang province
Geography of Satun province
Strait of Malacca
Tourist attractions in Trang province
Tourist attractions in Satun province
1984 establishments in Thailand